The Eurovision Song Contest 1974 was the 19th edition of the annual Eurovision Song Contest. It took place in Brighton, United Kingdom and was organized by the European Broadcasting Union (EBU) and host broadcaster British Broadcasting Corporation (BBC). The contest was held at the Brighton Dome on 6 April 1974 and was hosted by Katie Boyle for the fourth and final time (having hosted the 1960, 1963 and 1968 editions).

Seventeen countries took part in the contest, with  being absent and  competing for the first time this year.

Location 

The contest was held in the seaside resort of Brighton on the south coast of the United Kingdom.

The venue which hosted the event was the Brighton Dome, an arts venue originally built for the Prince Regent (later George IV) and completed in 1805.

Format 
Each song was introduced by a 'postcard' featuring a montage of film material, beginning with library footage of the participating nation provided by the various national tourist organizations. This was then intercut with various clips of the artists in rehearsal, conducting their press conference with the media or posing for photographs in and around the Brighton Pavilion complex. It was the first time the contest had broadcast rehearsal footage or behind the scenes footage from the run-up to the grand final.

Participating countries 

Seventeen nations took part in this year's contest. Greece made their début in the contest, while France withdrew during the week of the contest after the sudden death of French President Georges Pompidou.

Conductors 
Each performance had a conductor who conducted the orchestra.

 Ossi Runne
 Nick Ingman
 
 Frode Thingnæs
 Giorgos Katsaros
 Yoni Rechter
 
 Sven-Olof Walldoff
 Charles Blackwell
 Raymond Donnez
 Pierre Chiffre
 Harry van Hoof
 Colman Pearce
 
 Pepe Ederer
 José Calvário
 

Jean-Claude Petit was scheduled to conduct the French entry prior to France's withdrawal.

Returning artists 
Bold indicates a previous winner

Participants and results

Detailed voting results

Spokespersons 

The two-person jury system used for the previous three contests was abandoned, with a resurrection of the 10-person jury system with one vote per juror, last used in 1970, returning. This was the final time it was used. Unusually, a separate draw was made for the order in which the participating countries would vote. In all previous contests either nations had voted in the same running order as the song presentation or in the reverse of that order. It was not until 2006 that the voting sequence was decided by draw again. Finland, Norway, Switzerland and Italy drew the same position in both draws.

Listed below is the order in which votes were cast during the 1974 contest along with the spokesperson who was responsible for announcing the votes for their respective country.

 
 TBC
 
 
 Colin Ward-Lewis
 Helga Vlahović
 
 Brendan Balfe
 
 Henrique Mendes
 Dick van Bommel
 Sven Lindahl
 Antolín García
 Sophie Hecquet
 Michel Stocker
 André Hagon

Broadcasts 

Each participating broadcaster was required to relay the contest via its networks. Non-participating EBU member broadcasters were also able to relay the contest as "passive participants". Broadcasters were able to send commentators to provide coverage of the contest in their own native language and to relay information about the artists and songs to their television viewers.

The contest was broadcast live in all participating countries, except for Italy which took a deferred transmission. The contest was also reportedly broadcast in Algeria, Austria, Bulgaria, Cyprus, Czechoslovakia, France, Hungary, Japan, Jordan, Iceland, Morocco, Poland, South Korea, the Soviet Union and Tunisia. In addition to the broadcast on television, the contest was also provided via radio in Belgium, Finland, Germany, Ireland, Norway, Spain, Sweden, Switzerland and the United Kingdom. Known details on the broadcasts in each country, including the specific broadcasting stations and commentators are shown in the tables below.

Incidents

French withdrawal
France had been drawn to sing at No. 14 (after Ireland and before Germany) with the song "La Vie à vingt-cinq ans" by Dani, but as a mark of respect following the death of the French President Georges Pompidou during Eurovision week, French broadcaster ORTF made the decision to withdraw the entry. Given that President Pompidou's memorial service (he had been buried in a private ceremony on 4 April), which was attended by numerous international dignitaries, was held on the same day as the contest, it was deemed inappropriate for the French to take part. Dani was seen by viewers in the audience at the point the French song should have been performed. For the same reason, the French singer Anne-Marie David, who had won the first place for Luxembourg in 1973, could not come to Brighton to hand the prize to the 1974 winner. In her absence, the Director General of the BBC and President of the EBU, Sir Charles Curran, presented the Grand Prix to the winners.

Italian broadcast
Italy did not broadcast the televised contest on the state television channel RAI because the contest coincided with the intense political campaigning for the 1974 Italian referendum on divorce, which was held a month later in May. RAI felt that Gigliola Cinquetti's song, which was entitled "Sì", and repeatedly featured the word "si" (yes), could risk the accusation of being a subliminal message and a form of propaganda to influence the Italian voting public to vote "yes" in the referendum. The song was not played on most Italian state TV and radio stations until the referendum had been held.

Notes

References

External links 

 
1974
Music festivals in the United Kingdom
1974 in music
1974 in the United Kingdom
20th century in East Sussex
April 1974 events in Europe
Music in Brighton and Hove
Events in Brighton and Hove